
 
Tsogtsalu or Tsolu is a pasture and campsite in the Ladakh union territory of India, in the Chang Chenmo Valley close India's border with China. It is located at the confluence of the Rimdi Chu river that flows down from Marsemik La and the Chang Chenmo River. During the British Raj, this was a halting spot for travellers to Central Asia via the 'Chang Chenmo route', passing through Aksai Chin. After Indian independence, a border outpost was established here by a border police party headed by Captain Karam Singh. It continues to serve as a base for India's border forces.

See also
 Kongka Pass

Notes

References

Bibliography

External links

 Remembering supreme sacrifice of martyrs of CRPF on this day at Hot springs, Ladakh in 1959 - ITBP Twitter

Chang Chenmo Valley